Hiurud (also Romanized as Hīūrūd; also known as Havehrū, Hīrūd, Hūāru, Hūharū, Hūrū, Hūvarū, Hūvehrū, and Huvehrū) is a village in Gurani Rural District, Gahvareh District, Dalahu County, Kermanshah Province, Iran. At the 2006 census, its population was 83, in 17 families.

References 

Populated places in Dalahu County